The 1999 Edmonton Eskimos, coached by Don Matthews, finished in third place in the West Division with a 6–12 record. They were defeated in the West Semi-Final by the Calgary Stampeders.

Offseason

CFL Draft

Preseason

Schedule

Regular season

Season standings

Season schedule 

Awards and records

1999 CFL All-Stars

Offence 
 OG – Leo Groenewegen

Western All-Star Selections

Offence 
 OG – Leo Groenewegen, Edmonton Eskimos
 OG – Val St. Germain, Edmonton Eskimos

Defence 
 DT – Doug Petersen, Edmonton Eskimos
 LB – Terry Ray, Edmonton Eskimos

Playoffs 

Edmonton Eskimos
Edmonton Elks seasons